Lazrou is a town in north-eastern Algeria with a population of 5,143 people as of the 2008 census.

References

Communes of Batna Province
Algeria
Cities in Algeria